Muthireddy Gudem is a village in Yadadri district in Telangana, India. It falls under Bhongir mandal, 15 km away on the NH 202.
 ముత్తిరెడ్డిగూడెం గ్రామం అనేది చాల చైతన్యవంతమైన గ్రామం... తెలంగాణ ఉద్యమంలో చాలా చురుగ్గా పాల్గొన్న గ్రామం ఈ గ్రామంలో చౌరస్తా ఉన్నది కనుక ప్రధాన రహదారిపై రాకపోకలు రద్దీ ఎక్కువగా ఉంటుంది మరియు ఈ గ్రామం సుమారు 7, 8 గ్రామాలకు వసతులు కల్పింస్తుంది ఇక్కడ ప్రైవేట్ ఆస్పత్రిలు కలవు.. తెలంగాణ ఉద్యమంలో చురుగ్గా పాల్గొన్న ఈ గ్రామం రాష్ట్రంలో చాల మంది ప్రముఖుల దృష్టిలో ఉన్నది... ఒక్కోను ఒక్క సందర్భంలో అప్పటి ఉద్యమ నాయకులు, ప్రస్తుత ముఖ్యమంత్రి కెసిఆర్ దృష్టిని కూడా ఆకర్షించింది... సూమారు ఈ గ్రామంలో 2500 జనాభా కలదు 1300 పై చిలుకు ఓటర్లు ఉన్నారు... ఒక్క ఉన్నత పాఠశాల కలదు.. ఉన్నత పాఠశాలకు చుట్టుపక్కల గ్రామాలు సూమారు 5 గ్రామాల విద్యార్థులు వస్తారు... ఒక్క తాటి పై గ్రామస్తులు ఉంది అనేక పోరాటాలు చేశారు

References

Villages in Yadadri Bhuvanagiri district